Adam Maximilian Shoemaker (born 1957) is a Canadian-Australian academic and higher education administrator, and a scholarly authority within the field of Indigenous Australian literature. He currently serves as Vice-Chancellor of Victoria University.

Education
Shoemaker was born in Canada, and holds a BA Honours degree from Queen's University in Ontario, Canada (1979), and a PhD from the Australian National University in Canberra, Australia (1986).

Professional career
Shoemaker has held several positions in higher education administration in Australia, including at Griffith University, Monash University, the Australian National University and in 2016 he was appointed Vice-Chancellor of Southern Cross University. In late-2020, he commenced as Vice-Chancellor and President of Victoria University.

Honours and awards
Shoemaker is a Commonwealth Scholar. He also has received a number of literary awards, including being highly commended for the Human Rights Awards, and winner of the Walter McRae Russell Award.

Select publications
 Shoemaker, A.M. 1993. Mudrooroo: A Critical Study. Pymble: Angus and Robertson.
 Shoemaker, A.M. (ed.) 1998. A Sea Change: Australian Writing and Photography. Sydney: Sydney Organising Committee for the Olympic Games.
 Shoemaker, A.M. 2004. Black Words, White Page: Aboriginal Literature 1929-1988. Canberra: ANU Press.
 Muecke, S. and Shoemaker, A.M. 2002. Les Aborigènes d'Australie, collection « Découvertes Gallimard » (nº 428), série Culture et société. Paris: Éditions Gallimard.
 Muecke, S. and Shoemaker, A.M. 2004. Aboriginal Australians: First Nations of an Ancient Continent, 'New Horizons' series. London: Thames and Hudson.

References

1957 births
Living people
Australian academic administrators
Australian National University alumni